Kankjole is a small village in Sahebganj district, Jharkhand. The village shares its border with West Bengal to the east.

References 

Villages in Sahibganj district